William Davis (born Gunther Keese; 6 March 1933 – 2 February 2019), was a journalist, broadcaster and editor.  He was born in Germany but came to Britain in his teens, working for the Financial Times, Evening Standard and Guardian.  He broadcast for the BBC and was a pioneering presenter of The Money Programme and The World at One.  He became editor of Punch and was the founder of the British Airways in-flight magazine High Life.  He became chairman of the British Tourist Authority and English Tourist Board in the 1990s and remained an active commentator, broadcaster and writer until his death in February 2019.

Early life
Davis was born Gunther Kiess in Hanover, Germany, in 1933. During an appearance on BBC Radio 4's Desert Island Discs programme later in life, he described his childhood growing up in Germany during World War II as "very grim". Davis came to Britain aged 16, adopted British citizenship and anglicised his name. By the age of 18, he was already a journalist and specialised in commentary about economic and financial affairs.

Career
During 1954–1959, William Davis was on the staff of the Financial Times, a British international business newspaper. Lord Beaverbrook appointed Davis the City Editor (1960–1965) of the London Evening Standard and he then went on to become Economics Editor (1965–1968) of The Guardian.

During this time Davis made regular appearances on the BBC's live Budget programmes presented by Ian Trethowan. Davis provided live comment and analysis of the Chancellor of the Exchequer's Budget speech as it was delivered in the House of Commons. There were no microphones or cameras in Parliament at the time, so details were relayed to the BBC studio via a teleprinter.

Davis presented BBC North's financial programme Prospect. He took the idea of popular financial journalism to Grace Wyndham Goldie and developed the idea into The Money Programme for BBC2, which he also presented. Davis was one of the first presenters of the Radio 4 programme The World at One, a role he shared with William Hardcastle.

In 1968 William Davis was elected editor of the satirical magazine Punch and the rival publication Private Eye dubbed him "Kaiser Bill".

Davis was a chairman and a director of several publishing and travel companies. He founded and was editor-in-chief of, the in-flight magazine High Life. In the early 1990s William Davis became chairman of the British Tourist Authority and English Tourist Board.

Davis appeared as a contributor on The Pound in Your Pocket, a retrospective series of archive programmes shown on BBC Parliament in 2007. The programme marked forty years since the devaluation of the Pound by the British government on 18 November 1967, a subject covered by Davis in his book Three Years' Hard Labour: The Road to Devaluation.

Death 
Davis died at his home in Cannes, southern France, on 2 February 2019, after suffering heart failure.

Bibliography
The following are books written by William Davis:

Three Years' Hard Labour: The Road to Devaluation, 1968
Merger Mania, 1970
The Language of Money, 1973
’'Pick of Punch'’, 1973 (editor)
Have Expenses, Will Travel, 1975
It's No Sin to be Rich, 1976
The Best of Everything (editor), 1981
The Rich, 1982
Corporate Infighter's Handbook, 1984
Fantasy: A Practical Guide to Escapism, 1984
The Innovators, 1987
Children of the Rich, 1989
The Lucky Generation, 1995
The Great Myths of Business, 1997
The Rich: A New Study of the Species, 2006
Caviar Dogs, 2008
The Luck Factor, 2010
The Alien, An Autobiography, 2014
Lend Me Your Ears, 2016
Wit and Humour Series (editor), 2016
We Must Do Lunch, 2017

References

1933 births
2019 deaths
People from Hanover
Financial Times people
German emigrants to England
London Evening Standard people
Punch (magazine) people
The Guardian journalists
Naturalised citizens of the United Kingdom